<onlyinclude>
This is a list of the Sites of Special Scientific Interest (SSSIs) in Greater Manchester, a metropolitan county in North West England. In England the body responsible for designating SSSIs is Natural England, which chooses a site because of its fauna, flora, geological or physiographical features.  , there are 21 sites designated within this Area of Search, of which 14 have been designated due to their biological interest, 5 due to their geological interest, and 2 for both biological and geological interest.

Natural England took over the role of designating and managing SSSIs from English Nature in October 2006 when it was formed from the amalgamation of English Nature, parts of the Countryside Agency and the Rural Development Service. Natural England, like its predecessor, uses the 1974–1996 county system and as such the same approach is followed here, rather than splitting these sites between the Lancashire and Cheshire lists. The data in the table is taken from English Nature's website in the form of citation sheets for each SSSI.

For other counties, see List of SSSIs by Area of Search.

Sites

Notes 

Data rounded to one decimal place.
Grid reference is based on the British national grid reference system, also known as OSGB36, and is the system used by the Ordnance Survey.
Link to maps using the Nature  on the Map service provided by Natural England.
The Gale Clough and Shooterslee Wood site extends into the county of Lancashire and so can be found on the list of SSSIs in Lancashire.
The Dark Peak site extends into three other counties and so can be found on lists of SSSIs in Derbyshire, South Yorkshire and West Yorkshire.
The Ludworth Intake site extends into the county of Derbyshire and so can be found on the list of SSSIs in Derbyshire.
The South Pennine Moors site extends into three other counties and so can be found on lists of SSSIs in Lancashire, North Yorkshire and West Yorkshire.

References 

 
Greater Manchester
Sites of Special